Gladys Akpa  (born 1 January 1986) is a Nigerian footballer who plays as a defender for the Nigeria women's national football team. She was part of the team at the 2010 African Women's Championship and 2012 African Women's Championship. At the club level, she played for Sunshine Queens in Nigeria. She played in the Nigerian versus Mali match of 20 November 2016; Nigerian versus Ghana match of 23 November 2016; Nigerian versus Kenya match of 26 November 2016; Nigeria versus South Africa match of 29 November 2016 and Nigerian versus Cameroon match of 3 December 2016.

International
Nigeria
African Women's Championship Winner (2): 2010, 2016

References

External links
 

1986 births
Living people
Nigerian women's footballers
Nigeria women's international footballers
Place of birth missing (living people)
Women's association football defenders
Sunshine Queens F.C. players